The Académie Française, also known as the French Academy, is the principal French council for matters pertaining to the French language. The Académie was officially established in 1635 by Cardinal Richelieu, the chief minister to King Louis XIII. Suppressed in 1793 during the French Revolution, it was restored as a division of the Institut de France in 1803 by Napoleon Bonaparte. It is the oldest of the five  of the institute. The body has the duty of acting as an official authority on the language; it is tasked with publishing an official dictionary of the language.

New members are elected by the members of the Académie itself. Academicians normally hold office for life, but they may resign or be dismissed for misconduct. Philippe Pétain, named Marshal of France after the Battle of Verdun of World War I, was elected to the Académie in 1931 and, after his governorship of Vichy France in World War II, was forced to resign his seat in 1945.

History

The Académie had its origins in an informal literary group deriving from the salons held at the Hôtel de Rambouillet during the late 1620s and early 1630s. The group began meeting at Valentin Conrart's house, seeking informality. There were then nine members. Cardinal Richelieu, the chief minister of France, made himself protector of the group, and in anticipation of the formal creation of the academy, new members were appointed in 1634. On 22 February 1635, at Richelieu's urging, King Louis XIII granted letters patent formally establishing the council; according to the letters patent registered at the Parlement de Paris on 10 July 1637, the Académie Française was "to labor with all the care and diligence possible, to give exact rules to our language, to render it capable of treating the arts and sciences". The Académie Française has remained responsible for the regulation of French grammar, spelling, and literature.

Richelieu's model, the first academy devoted to eliminating the "impurities" of a language, was the Accademia della Crusca, founded in Florence in 1582, which formalized the already dominant position of the Tuscan dialect of Florence as the model for Italian; the Florentine academy had published its Vocabolario in 1612.

During the French Revolution, the National Convention suppressed all royal academies, including the Académie Française. In 1792, the election of new members to replace those who died was prohibited; in 1793, the academies were themselves abolished. They were all replaced in 1795 by a single body called the Institut de France. Napoleon Bonaparte, as First Consul, decided to restore the former academies, but only as "classes" or divisions of the Institut de France. The second class of the Institut was responsible for the French language, and corresponded to the former Académie Française. When King Louis XVIII came to the throne in 1816, each class regained the title of "Académie"; accordingly, the second class of the Institut became the Académie Française. Since 1816, the existence of the Académie Française has been uninterrupted.

The President of France is the "protector" or patron of the Académie. Cardinal Richelieu originally adopted this role; upon his death in 1642, Pierre Séguier, the Chancellor of France, succeeded him. King Louis XIV adopted the function when Séguier died in 1672; since then, the French head of state has always served as the Académie's protector. From 1672 to 1805, the official meetings of the Académie were in the Louvre; since 1805, the Académie Française has met in the Collège des Quatre-Nations (known now as the Palais de l'Institut). The remaining academies of the Institut de France also meet in the Palais de l'Institut.

Membership
The Académie Française has forty seats, each of which is assigned a separate number. Candidates make their applications for a specific seat, not to the Académie in general: if several seats are vacant, a candidate may apply separately for each. Since a newly elected member is required to eulogize their predecessor in the installation ceremony, it is not uncommon that potential candidates refuse to apply for particular seats because they dislike the predecessors.

The Secretary is called "Perpetual", as though the holder serves for life, but holds the ability to resign, they may thereafter be styled as "Honorary Perpetual Secretary", with three post-World War II Perpetual Secretaries having previously resigned due to old age. The Perpetual Secretary acts as a chairperson and chief representative of the Académie. The two other officers, a Director and a Chancellor, are elected for three-month terms. The most senior member, by date of election, is the Dean of the Académie.

New members are elected by the Académie itself; the original members were appointed. When a seat becomes vacant, a person may apply to the Secretary if they wish to become a candidate. Alternatively, existing members may nominate other candidates. A candidate is elected by a majority of votes from voting members. A quorum is twenty members. If no candidate receives an absolute majority, another election must be performed at a later date. The election is valid only if the protector of the Académie, the President of France, grants their approval. The President's approbation, however, is only a formality.

The new member is then installed at a meeting of the Académie. The new member must deliver a speech to the Académie, which includes a eulogy for the member being replaced. This is followed by a speech made by one of the members. Eight days thereafter, a public reception is held, during which the new member makes a speech thanking their colleagues for their election. On one occasion, one newly-installed member, Georges de Porto-Riche, was not accorded a reception, as the eulogy he made of his predecessor was considered unsatisfactory, and he refused to rewrite it. Georges Clemenceau refused to be received, as he feared being received by his enemy, Raymond Poincaré.

Members remain in the Académie for life. However, the council may dismiss an academician for grave misconduct. The first dismissal occurred in 1638, when Auger de Moléon de Granier was expelled for theft. The most recent dismissals occurred at the end of World War II: Philippe Pétain, Abel Bonnard, Abel Hermant, and Charles Maurras were all excluded for their association with the Vichy regime. In total, 20 members have been expelled from the Académie.

There have been a total of 732 , of whom nine were women (the first, Marguerite Yourcenar, was elected in 1980 – besides those elected, 25 women have been candidates, with the first in 1874). Individuals who are not citizens of France may be, and have been, elected. Moreover, although most academicians are writers, it is not necessary to be a member of the literary profession to become a member. The Académie has included numerous politicians, lawyers, scientists, historians, philosophers, and senior Roman Catholic clergymen. Five French heads of state have been members - Adolphe Thiers, Raymond Poincaré, Paul Deschanel, Philippe Pétain, and Valéry Giscard d'Estaing - and one foreign head of state, the poet Léopold Sédar Senghor of Senegal, who was also the first African elected, in 1983. Other famous members include Voltaire; Charles, baron de Montesquieu; Victor Hugo; Alexandre Dumas, fils; Émile Littré; Louis Pasteur; Louis de Broglie; and Henri Poincaré.

Many notable French writers have not become members of the Académie Française. In 1855, the writer Arsène Houssaye devised the expression "forty-first seat" for deserving individuals who were never elected to the Académie, either because their candidacies were rejected, because they were never candidates, or because they died before appropriate vacancies arose. Notable French authors who never became academicians include Jean-Jacques Rousseau, Jean-Paul Sartre, Joseph de Maistre, Honoré de Balzac, René Descartes, Denis Diderot, Romain Rolland, Charles Baudelaire, Gustave Flaubert, Molière, Marcel Proust, Jules Verne, Théophile Gautier, and Émile Zola.

Uniform

The , worn at the Académie's formal ceremonies, was first adopted during Napoleon Bonaparte's reorganization of the Institut de France. It consists of a long black coat and black-feathered bicorne, both richly embroidered with green leafy motifs, together with black trousers or skirt. Further, members other than clergy carry a ceremonial sword.

The members bear the cost of their uniforms themselves. The robes cost around $50,000, and Amin Maalouf said that his induction cost him some $230,000 overall.

Role as authority on the French language

The Académie is France's official authority on the usages, vocabulary, and grammar of the French language.

Dictionary
A special commission composed of several (but not all) of the members of the Académie compiles the work.

The Académie has published thirteen editions of the dictionary, of which three were preliminary, eight were complete, and two were supplements for specialised words. These are:

 Preliminary editions:
  (from A to Aversion), pre-edition, Frankfurt am Main, 1687
  (from A to Confiture), pre-edition, Frankfurt am Main, 1687
  (from A to Neuf), pre-edition, Paris, 1687
 Complete editions:
  ("1st edition"), Paris, 1694
  ("2nd edition"), Paris, 1718
  ("3rd edition"), Paris, 1740
  ("4th edition"), Paris, 1762
  ("5th edition"), Paris, 1798
  ("6th edition"), Paris, 1835
  ("7th edition"), Paris, 1879
  ("8th edition"), Paris, 1932–1935
 Supplementary editions for the sciences, arts, and technology:
 Corneille, Thomas, Paris, 1694
 Barré, Louis, Paris, 1842

In 1778, the Académie attempted to compile a "historical dictionary" of the French language; this idea, however, was later abandoned, the work never progressing past the letter A.

Anglicisms

As the use of English terms by media increased over the years, the Académie has tried to prevent the Anglicization of the French language. For example, the Académie has recommended the avoidance of loanwords from modern English (such as walkman, computer,  software and e-mail), in favour of neologisms, i.e. newly coined French words derived from existing ones (and  respectively).

However, the Académie has also noted that anglicisms have been present in the French language since the 1700s, and has criticized the view that anglicisms present an "invasion" on the French language. It distinguishes anglicisms into three categories: some that are useful to the French language and introduced vocabulary which didn't have a French equivalent at the time (the Académie cites the word "confortable" as an example, from the English "comfortable"); others that are detrimental and only establish more confusion as the original meaning of the word is distorted in translation; and others still that are useless or avoidable, a category of anglicisms used by "snobs" who use words from an English provenance to demarcate themselves from society and appear "in vogue". For the last category of anglicisms, the Académie writes that those words are typically short-lived in French parlance. The Académie Française has informed government officials to stop using English gaming terms like "e-sports", it should be "jeu video de competition". Likewise "streamer" should be "joueur-animateur en direct".

Alleged conservatism

The Académie, despite working on the modernization of the French orthography, has sometimes been criticized by many linguists for allegedly behaving in an overly conservative manner.
A recent controversy involved the officialization of feminine equivalents for the names of several professions. For instance, in 1997, Lionel Jospin's government began using the feminine noun "la ministre" to refer to a female minister, following the official practice of Canada, Belgium and Switzerland and a frequent, though until then unofficial, practice in France. The Académie, however, insisted in accordance with French grammar rules on the traditional use of the masculine noun, "le ministre", for a minister of either gender. In 2017, 77 linguists retaliated with an opinion column to denounce the “incompetence and anachronism of the Académie”. Use of either form remains highly controversial.

Prizes

The Académie Française is responsible for awarding several different prizes in various fields (including literature, painting, poetry, theatre, cinema, history, and translation). Almost all of the prizes were created during the twentieth century, and only two prizes were awarded before 1780. In total, the Académie awards more than sixty prizes, most of them annually.

The most important prize is the Grand prix de la francophonie, which was instituted in 1986, and is funded by the governments of France, Canada, Monaco, and Morocco. Other important prizes include the Grand prix de littérature (for a literary work), the grand prix du roman (for a novel), the Grand prix de poésie de l'Académie française (for poetry), the Grand prix de philosophie (for a philosophical work), the Grand prix du cinéma (for film), and the grand prix Gobert (for a work on French history).

Opposition of regional languages
The Académie Française intervened in June 2008 to oppose the French Government's  proposal to constitutionally offer recognition and protection to regional languages (Flemish, Alsatian, Basque, Breton, Catalan, Corsican, Occitan, Gascon, and Arpitan).

Current members

The current members of the Académie Française are:

See also 

 Academy of sciences
 Conseil international de la langue française
 Former prizes awarded by the Académie française
 French art salons and academies
 Language policy in France
 List of language regulators
 Language council
 Montyon Prize – prizes awarded annually by the Académie française and the Académie des sciences
 Office québécois de la langue française
 Paschimbanga Bangla Academy
 Proposals for an English Academy
 Royal Spanish Academy
 Swedish Academy

Explanatory notes

References

Citations

General sources 

 Viala, Alain (2001). "Académie Française", vol. 1, pp. 6–9, in Encyclopedia of the Enlightenment, edited by Michel Delon. Chicago: Fitzroy Dearborn. .
 Vincent, Leon H. (1901). The French Academy. Boston: Houghton Mifflin.

External links

 L'Académie française 
 L'Académie française from the Scholarly Societies project.
 
 Dictionnaire de l'Académie française, neuvième édition 

 
French language in France
Institut de France
Language regulators
6th arrondissement of Paris
Arts and culture in the Ancien Régime
1635 establishments in France
Organizations established in 1635
Organizations based in France
Cardinal Richelieu